Pultenaea foliolosa, commonly known as the small-leaf bush-pea, is a species of flowering plant in the family Fabaceae and is endemic to eastern Australia. It is an erect to low-lying shrub with elliptic to oblong leaves that are concave on the upper surface, and yellow to orange and reddish-brown flowers.

Description

Taxonomy
Pultenaea foliolosa was first formally described in 1837 by George Bentham from an unpublished description by Allan Cunningham. Bentham's description was published in his book Commentationes de Leguminosarum Generibus.

Distribution and habitat
Small-leaf bush-pea grows in forest and woodland on the tablelands of south-eastern Queensland, New South Wales and north-eastern Victoria.

References

Fabales of Australia
Flora of New South Wales
Flora of Queensland
Flora of Victoria (Australia)
foliolosa
Plants described in 1837
Taxa named by George Bentham